Ben Cavarra (born 20 December 1995) is an Australian rules footballer playing for the Western Bulldogs in the Australian Football League (AFL). He spent a decorated junior career as a midfielder at the Eastern Ranges in the TAC Cup. Overlooked by AFL clubs because of his height, he spent four seasons in the Victorian Football League (VFL) with Frankston and Williamstown, where he took on his present role as a small forward. He was selected by the Western Bulldogs in the 2018 national draft, the sixth time he had nominated.

Junior and VFL career 
Cavarra is from Lysterfield, a suburb of Melbourne, and was educated at St Joseph's in nearby Ferntree Gully. He spent a successful stint of junior football at the Eastern Ranges in the TAC Cup, starting by winning the 2012 Pennington Medal (the club's best and fairest award) as a bottom-age player. A strong 2013 season followed; Cavarra captained the Ranges to a premiership, winning the TAC Medal as best on ground in the grand final. He also tied for the Morrish Medal (the competition's best and fairest) on 16 votes, and won a second consecutive Pennington Medal, a feat that had previously been matched only by Sam Mitchell and Rory Sloane. Cavarra also represented Vic Metro at that year's AFL Under 18 Championships. He missed out on attending the national draft combine, instead attending the Victorian session, where he ran a 20-metre sprint in under three seconds, a personal best.

Cavarra was not selected in the 2013 AFL draft, despite his accolades; clubs were chiefly concerned about his short stature (he stood at just ), but also his lack of speed and kicking accuracy. He considered joining a VFL team, and decided on the Frankston Dolphins, as the club was not affiliated with an AFL team, meaning he would have a greater chance of playing in their senior side. Cavarra had largely played as a midfielder prior to joining Frankston, but expressed a desire to take on a forward-line role.

Over three years at the club, he played 51 games and kicked 44 goals, and won Frankston's best and fairest in 2014 and 2015 (finishing runner-up in 2016), earning interest from West Australian Football League clubs. Despite Cavarra's strong performances, he continued to be overlooked in AFL drafts. Frankston, in financial difficulties, decided not to compete in the 2017 VFL season. Cavarra joined another VFL team, Williamstown, where he switched to a small forward position. He kicked 66 goals in 40 matches over two seasons; in both, he led the club's goalkicking and was named in the VFL's team of the year.

AFL career 
Cavarra was selected by the Western Bulldogs with pick 45 in the 2018 national draft, marking his first successful nomination after five failures. His first season was marred by injury; he could only play 12 VFL games after suffering hamstring and quad tears, fractured ribs, which caused a minor cut to his liver, and a broken scapula. Over his off-season he practised Pilates sessions to strengthen his body, ensuring he could complete pre-season training. He made his senior debut in the opening round of the 2020 season, scoring a goal with his first kick. Cavarra was delisted at the end of 2021 season.

Box Hill Hawks

After the delisting by the  Cavarra signed with the Box Hill Hawks for the 2022 season. In a year in which he finished third in the VFL goalkicking, Cavarra and teammate Fergus Greene were selected as forward pockets in the VFL Team of the Year. Cavarra was also named captain of the VFL Team of the Year.

Statistics
 Statistics are correct to the end of 2021 season

|-
| scope="row" style="text-align:center" | 2019
|  || 25 || 0 || — || — || — || — || — || — || — || — || — || — || — || — || — || —
|- style="background-color: #EAEAEA"
! scope="row" style="text-align:center" | 2020
|style="text-align:center;"|
| 25 || 3 || 4 || 3 || 15 || 10 || 25 || 5 || 8 || 1.3 || 1.0 || 5.0 || 3.3 || 8.8 || 1.7 || 2.7
|-
| scope="row" text-align:center | 2021
| 
| 25 || 1 || 0 || 0 || 1 || 0 || 1 || 1 || 0 || 0.0 || 0.0 || 1.0 || 0.0 || 1.0 || 1.0 || 0.0
|- style="background:#EAEAEA; font-weight:bold; width:2em"
| scope="row" text-align:center class="sortbottom" colspan=3 | Career
| 4
| 4
| 3
| 16
| 10
| 26
| 6
| 9
| 1.0
| 0.8
| 4.0
| 2.5
| 6.5
| 1.5
| 2.3
|}

Personal life 
Cavarra studied a teaching degree at Wesley College, working part-time as a teaching assistant during his course. Before being drafted into the AFL, he worked at Rowville Primary School. After his AFL debut, he cited education as a career to potentially return to after finishing with football.

References

External links 

Living people
1995 births
Australian rules footballers from Melbourne
Eastern Ranges players
Frankston Football Club players
Williamstown Football Club players
Western Bulldogs players
Box Hill Football Club players
People from the City of Knox